Alexander Mitchell Duncan  (25 September 1888–1 September 1965) was a Scottish-Australian police officer. Duncan was Chief Commissioner of Victoria Police from 1937 to 1954.

Britain
Duncan was born in 1888 in Mortlach—a town in Banffshire in northern Scotland. His father, John, was a farmer and his mother, Elizabeth, née Mitchell.

After completing his education in Dufftown, Duncan moved to London where he joined the Metropolitan Police in 1910. He served with the Metropolitan Police for 26 years; most of his work with the Criminal Investigation Department. Duncan rose to the rank of Chief Inspector and in 1935 was given command of the "Flying Squad".

Australia
In 1936, Duncan was seconded to the state government of Victoria to inspect and report on the Victoria Police Force. The appointment was made by Premier of Victoria Albert Dunstan on the advice of the Metropolitan Police Commissioner Sir Philip Game—a former Governor of New South Wales. Dunstan ordered the inspection after the controversial resignation of the previous Chief Commissioner Thomas Blamey amid public allegations of widespread corruption within the force.

Duncan presented two reports to the Victorian government which recommended a range of reforms, including detective training and the use of forensic science and changes to the promotion system and the deployment of personnel. The recommendations were accepted by the government who then appointed Duncan to the position of Chief Commissioner "with a mandate to introduce the reforms".

Once appointed, Duncan began the task of dealing with "entrenched bad practice, poor leadership, maladministration and corruption.  Duncan made some headway in his term but was unable to address these problems immediately. Duncan retired from Victoria Police in 1954.

Private life
Duncan married Elizabeth Ann MacDonald on 1 September 1917 at Trinity Presbyterian Church, Lambeth, with whom he had one daughter. Duncan was active in the "Boy Scouts' Association, Melbourne Rotary, YMCA, the Royal Humane Society, the National Fitness Council and the State Relief Committee." He died in Brighton, a suburb of Melbourne, in 1965.

Honours and awards

References

1888 births
1965 deaths
People from Banffshire
Scottish emigrants to Australia
Scottish police officers
Metropolitan Police officers
Chief Commissioners of Victoria Police
Companions of the Order of St Michael and St George